DNAP may refer to:
 DNA polymerase, a class of enzymes
 DnaP, a bacterial DNA replication enzyme
 Doctor of Nurse Anesthesia Practice, an academic degree
 Dyno Nobel Asia Pacific, a subsidiary of Dyno Nobel
 DNA Plant Technology (stock exchange abbreviation: DNAP), an American company
 Deutschnational Arbeiterband, one of the a Weimar political parties